Music Inside (Spanish:Con la música por dentro) is a 1947 Mexican musical comedy film directed by Humberto Gómez Landero and starring Germán Valdés, Marcelo Chávez and Marga López.

Cast
 Germán Valdés as Tin Tán / Hortensia  
 Marcelo Chávez as Don Nardo del Valle  
 Marga López as Rosita del Valle  
 Isabelita Blanch as Margarita  
 Carlos Martínez Baena as Molinette  
 Eduardo Vivas as Conde Francisco José Federico Maximiliano 
 Maruja Grifell as Condesa 
 Rafael Icardo as Jacinto  
 Manuel Roche as Narciso

References

Bibliography 
 Carlos Monsiváis & John Kraniauskas. Mexican Postcards. Verso, 1997.

External links 
 

1947 films
1947 musical comedy films
Mexican musical comedy films
1940s Spanish-language films
Films directed by Humberto Gómez Landero
Mexican black-and-white films
1940s Mexican films